Sainte Marie Airport  is an airport serving Sainte Marie, an island in the Analanjirofo Region of Madagascar.

Airlines and destinations

References

External links 
 
 

Airports in Madagascar
Analanjirofo